Major-General Sir Andrew Jameson McCulloch  (14 July 1876 – 19 April 1960) was a senior British Army officer.

Military career
Born the son of Lord Ardwall and Christian Brown, as "Andrew Jameson", he was educated at Edinburgh Academy, the University of St Andrews and New College, Oxford. He adopted the surname McCulloch for inheritance purposes in 1892. After studying at the Inner Temple and qualifying as an advocate, he was admitted to the Scottish bar in September 1897. He enlisted as a private soldier in the City of London Imperial Volunteers and then transferred to the Highland Light Infantry in August 1900.

He saw action in the Second Boer War and he then commanded the 9th Battalion, the King's Own Yorkshire Light Infantry from October 1917 and then the 64th Infantry Brigade from July 1917 during the First World War. He was awarded the Distinguished Service Order with two bars for his service during the war. The citation for his second bar reads:

After the war he became commander of 62nd Infantry Brigade in 1919, commander of the 2nd Infantry Brigade at Aldershot in 1926 and Commandant of the Senior Officers' School at Sheerness in 1930. He went on to be General Officer Commanding 52nd (Lowland) Infantry Division in 1934, temporary commander of the Troops in Malta in 1935 and then General Officer Commanding 52nd (Lowland) Infantry Division again from 1936 until he retired in 1938.

Family
In 1905 he married Esmé Valentine Mackenzie; they had three sons.

References

|-

|-

|-

1876 births
1960 deaths
Military personnel from Edinburgh
British Army major generals
British Army generals of World War I
British Army personnel of the Second Boer War
Knights Commander of the Order of the British Empire
Companions of the Order of the Bath
Companions of the Distinguished Service Order
Recipients of the Distinguished Conduct Medal
Highland Light Infantry officers
Commandants of the Senior Officers' School, Sheerness